Linda E. Blakley (née Stevens; born 1 July 1947) is an English actress, known for her role as Pam Coker in the BBC soap opera EastEnders.

Career
In 2004, Blakley appeared in the film The Football Factory as the mother to Tamara (Sophie Linfield) and the stage productions of Effi's Burning and All My Sons as Effi and Kate respectively. The following year, she played Pam in Shaking Dreamland and Maureen Groves in Derailed. In 2006 and 2007, Blakley made guest appearances in the ITV drama Vital Signs and the BBC soap opera Doctors as Irene and Susan Staplehurst respectively. She also appeared in stage productions of Hay Fever and You Never Can Tell as Clara and Mrs. Clandon in 2006 and in the stage production of Puntill and his man Matti as Emma in 2007. In 2007, Blakley also appeared in short film, Gone Fishing as Emily and an episode of ITV police drama The Bill. The following year, Blakley starred in film Sydney Turtlebaum as Brenda, TV film The Children as Mel, a second episode of The Bill as Lorna Wickham and in a one-woman performance of Talking Heads.

In 2009, Blakley appeared in the film, Malice in Wonderland as Mrs. Jones; one episode of the ITV murder drama, Midsomer Murders as Janet Painter; one further episode of Doctors as Elaine Preston; as lead role, Ursula in the stage production of Vincent in Brixton; and in the stage production of The Entertainer as Phoebe. In the following year, she played Rachael Pennington in an episode of BBC medical drama, Holby City and played Marguerita in the stage production of The Miser. 2011 saw Blakley appear in two films: Late Bloomers as 'The Grey Panther' and Age of Heroes as Mrs. Shepard. She also appeared in an episode of Law & Order: UK as Jessica. In 2012, she appeared in: Rufus Stone, a short film, as Abigail; an episode of One Night, a BBC one-off four-part drama, as Joan Burton, and an episode of Hunted, a BBC drama, as Grandma Freeman. In 2013, she appeared as Barbara Kay in her third episode of Doctors and also starred in an episode of BBC fantasy-adventure drama Atlantis as Emily. In December 2017, she appeared as Mrs. Claus in a Kellogg’s Corn Flakes advert. The following month, Blakley appeared in BBC medical drama, Casualty, as cancer patient Maggie Coomes.

EastEnders
Blakley joined the cast of the BBC soap opera EastEnders as the wife of undertaker Les Coker (Roger Sloman), Pam, following his promotion to the regular cast. They would be setting up their funeral business in the fictional setting of Walford. Pam was billed as "a small woman with a big heart and an even bigger shoulder to cry on." Sloman stated how delighted he was to be working with Blakley and when commenting about her casting, Blakley said: "Being part of EastEnders is like going to work and being with another family. I'm really enjoying myself. Working with Roger has been wonderful from the word go, we have a laugh together and I feel like I have known him forever." Executive producer Dominic Treadwell-Collins also spoke about how he enjoyed watching the chemistry between Sloman and Blakley.

Blakley was written out of the show alongside Sloman in 2016 following the appointment of a new executive producer. A show insider commented, "Pam and Les have been a big part of the show over the past few months and with their current storyline, bosses felt that it was the right time for their characters to leave the Square. There is still plenty more drama to come from the Cokers before they leave Walford." Pam departed in the episode broadcast on 14 October. Blakely filmed two appearances for the soap in 2017 and Pam appeared in the episodes broadcast on 25 May and 22 June. Pam made another appearance in the soap on 5 February 2018. Blakely reprised the role for two episodes in 2019, and the character reappeared across two episodes in November. She then made another return in January 2022.

Personal life
Blakley married founding member of the 1960s pop band The Tremeloes, Alan Blakley in 1969. Two years later they had a daughter, Kirsten, who would become the lead singer in indie band named Little Spitfire, and in 1974 they had a second daughter, Claudie, who became an actress, notable for starring in Pride and Prejudice and Lark Rise to Candleford. Blakley is also Patron of Windlesham Drama Group and President of the Quince Players, Sunninghill.

Filmography

Stage

References

External links
 

1949 births
Living people
English film actresses
English television actresses
English stage actresses
English soap opera actresses
Actors from Guildford
21st-century English actresses